Perphenazine enanthate, sold under the brand name Trilafon Enantat among others, is a typical antipsychotic and a depot antipsychotic ester which is used in the treatment of schizophrenia and has been marketed in Europe. It is formulated in sesame oil and administered by intramuscular injection and acts as a long-lasting prodrug of perphenazine. Perphenazine enanthate is used at a dose of 25 to 200 mg once every 2 weeks by injection, with a time to peak levels of 2 to 3 days and an elimination half-life of 4 to 7 days.

See also
 List of antipsychotics § Antipsychotic esters

References

Antipsychotic esters
Chloroarenes
Dopamine antagonists
Enanthate esters
Phenothiazines
Piperazines
Primary alcohols
Prodrugs
Sigma receptor ligands
Typical antipsychotics